Leslie Xcaret Soltero García (born 30 April 2001) is a Mexican taekwondo practitioner. She won the gold medal in the women's welterweight event at the 2022 World Taekwondo Championships held in Guadalajara, Mexico.

She won one of the bronze medals in the girls' 63 kg event at the 2018 Summer Youth Olympics held in Buenos Aires, Argentina. She also won one of the bronze medals in the women's 67 kg event at the 2021 Pan American Taekwondo Championships held in Cancún, Mexico.

She won the gold medal in her event at the 2021 Junior Pan American Games held in Cali, Colombia.

She won the silver medal in her event at the 2022 Pan American Taekwondo Championships held in Punta Cana, Dominican Republic.

References

External links
 
 

Living people
2001 births
Place of birth missing (living people)
Mexican female taekwondo practitioners
Taekwondo practitioners at the 2018 Summer Youth Olympics
World Taekwondo Championships medalists
Pan American Taekwondo Championships medalists
21st-century Mexican women